The elections for Oxford City Council took place on Thursday 22 May 2014. As Oxford City Council is elected by halves, one seat in each of the 24 wards is up for election, apart from in Summertown ward where both seats are up for election following the resignation of Councillor Stuart McCready on 3 April 2014.

Overall turnout was 37%, up from 29.4% in 2012.

Results

Note: six UKIP candidates stood in this election, compared with three in 2012 and one in 2010. One candidate stood for the Official Monster Raving Loony Party, compared with none in either 2010 or 2012. Four independent candidates were standing, compared with one each in 2012 and 2010. Plus/minus percentages are calculated with respect to the 2012 Oxford City Council election.

Total number of seats on the Council after the election:

Results by ward

Plus/minus percentages are calculated with respect to the 2010 Oxford City Council election.

Barton and Sandhills

Blackbird Leys

Carfax

Churchill

Cowley

Cowley Marsh

Headington

Headington Hill and Northway 

Note: Nicholas Fell was originally intending to stand for UKIP, but then was not nominated in time.

Hinksey Park

Holywell

Iffley Fields

Jericho and Osney

Littlemore

Lye Valley

Marston

North 

Note: gain/hold and percentage change calculated with respect to the by-election of 19 September 2013. In 2010, the seat was won by the Liberal Democrats.

Northfield Brook

Quarry and Risinghurst

Rose Hill and Iffley

St Clement's

St Margaret's

St Mary's

Summertown

Wolvercote

Party share of vote map

See also
Elections in the United Kingdom

References

2014
2014 English local elections
2010s in Oxford